Grant Charles Erickson (born April 28, 1947) is a Canadian retired professional ice hockey player who played 266 games in the World Hockey Association and 6 games in the National Hockey League between 1968 and 1976. He played for the Boston Bruins, Minnesota North Stars, Cleveland Crusaders, and Phoenix Roadrunners.

His lone NHL goal came on December 29, 1968 as a member of the Boston Bruins in a 3-3 tie versus Detroit at Olympia Stadium.

Career statistics

Regular season and playoffs

References 
 

1947 births
Living people
Boston Bruins players
Canadian expatriate ice hockey players in the United States
Canadian ice hockey left wingers
Cleveland Barons (1937–1973) players
Cleveland Crusaders players
Estevan Bruins players
Ice hockey people from Saskatchewan
Iowa Stars (CHL) players
Minnesota North Stars players
Oklahoma City Blazers (1965–1977) players
Phoenix Roadrunners (WHA) players
Rhode Island Reds players
Syracuse Blazers players
Tucson Mavericks players